Luis de Vega (? - Madrid, 1562) was a 16th-century Spanish architect appointed royal architect of Charles I. He renovated the old Alcazar of Madrid, the vanished royal residence, and transformed the pavilion on mount El Pardo, into what is now the Royal Palace of El Pardo.

With his nephew, the architect Gaspar de Vega, he worked on the vanished Palace of Valsaín and Torre de la Parada. In 1540 he designed the upper story of the "Patio de las Doncellas" (Courtyard of the Maidens) in the Alcázar of Seville.

He also worked on a number of manor houses including the Palace de Dueñas in Medina del Campo, and the Francisco de los Cobos Palace in Valladolid (the Valladolid Royal Palace).

References

Year of birth missing
Year of death missing
Spanish architects
Renaissance architects
16th-century Spanish architects